is the 27th single by Japanese girl group SKE48. It was released digitally and as a CD single on February 3, 2021, by Avex Trax. The song was written by Yasushi Akimoto and produced by Nobuaki Tanaka. Musically, it is a pop song. A music video premiered on January 12, 2021, to accompany the release of the song. 

Upon release, the song peaked at number one on both the Oricon Singles Chart and Japan Hot 100. It was eventually certified platinum by the Recording Industry Association of Japan (RIAJ).

Background and release
In November 2020, SKE48 announced the release of the single, "Koiochi Flag" to commemorate the graduation of member Jurina Matsui. It is a pop song with lyrics about friendship. The single was made available digitally as an EP, on February 3, 2021, by Avex Trax. The physical version was also released the same day in three editions: Regular, First press limited, and Seven net limited. Each edition was made available in CD+DVD formats in three types: A, B, and C; each type contains the single "Koiochi Flag" on the A-side. Additionally, type A includes "Memories 〜Itsunohika aeru made〜" and the instrumentals of both tracks on B-side, type B contains "Change Your World", while C has "Anogoro no rokkā". The DVD features music videos and bonus videos of the tracks. A live version of the single, which includes "Koiochi Flag" and "Oto no wareta chaimu" was released in Japan.

Commercial performance
"Koiochi Flag" was a commercial success in Japan. The single took the number one spot on its first day of release on Oricon Daily Singles Chart, selling 5,188 physical copies. The single peaked at number one on the Oricon Weekly Singles Chart, on the chart issue dated February 9, 2021, selling 191,000 copies in its opening week. It became SKE48's 23rd consecutive chart-topper, making them the fifth female artist in history to achieve this. It has been certified platinum by the Recording Industry Association of Japan (RIAJ) for sales exceeding 250,000 copies.

"Koiochi Flag" sold debuted at number one on the Japan Hot 100 chart on February 10, 2021, selling 17,897 digital downloads. The single recorded 196,556 copies in the tracking week, which was highest sales for that week.

Music video and promotion
The accompanying music video premiered on SKE48's YouTube channel on January 12, 2021. The video shows the members performing choreography in multiple groups. To promote the song, the group performed it live on the release day.

Track listing

Charts

Weekly charts

Year-end charts

Certifications

References

Footnotes

Citations 

 
 
 
 
 
 
 
 
 
 
 
 
 
 
 
 
 

2021 singles
SKE48 songs
2021 songs
Songs with lyrics by Yasushi Akimoto
Avex Trax singles
Oricon Weekly number-one singles
Billboard Japan Hot 100 number-one singles